Robert Foulis (20 April 1707 in Glasgow – 2 June 1776 in Edinburgh) was a Scottish printer and publisher.

Biography
Robert Foulis was born the son of a maltman. He was apprenticed to a barber, but was encouraged to become a publisher by Francis Hutcheson who was impressed by his ability.  After spending 1738 and 1739 in England and France in company with his brother, Andrew, who had been intended for the church and had received a better education, Robert set up a publishing business in 1741 in Glasgow, and in 1742 acquired his own press.  He bought type from the renowned type-maker and punch-cutter Alexander Wilson.  In 1743 he was appointed printer to the Glasgow University.  In the same year he produced the first Greek book published in Glasgow, namely the De Elocutione by Demetrius Phalereus.  It was also offered in Latin.

Soon he went into partnership with his brother.  Their press published books in English, Latin, Greek, French and Italian that were noticeable for their quality.  Indeed, the brothers were sometimes referred to as "the Elzevirs of Britain." They spared no pains, and Robert went to France to procure manuscripts of the classics, and to engage a skilled engraver and a copper-plate printer.

Among authors whose works were published by the Foulis press were Homer, Horace, Milton and Thomas Gray.  The Homer, for which John Flaxman's designs were executed, is perhaps the most famous production of the Foulis press. Famous as well, the 12mo edition of Horace was long, but erroneously, believed to be immaculate: though the successive sheets were posted in the university and a reward offered for the discovery of any inaccuracy, six errors at least, according to Thomas Frognall Dibdin, escaped detection; three of those were found by Duke Gordon.

It became their ambition to establish an institution for the encouragement of the fine arts. Though one of their chief patrons, the earl of Northumberland, warned them to "print for posterity and prosper," they spent their money in collecting pictures, pieces of sculpture and models, in paying for the education and traveling of youthful artists, and in copying the masterpieces of foreign art. This "Academy" not only proved a failure, but involved its founders in ruin. Robert went to London, hoping to realize a large sum by the sale of his pictures. They were sold for much less than he anticipated.

Robert was the author of a Catalogue of Paintings with Critical Remarks. The business was afterwards carried on under the same name by Robert's son Andrew. W. J. Duncan's Notices and Documents illustrative of the Literary History of Glasgow, printed for the Maitland Club in 1831, among other things contains a catalogue of the works printed at the Foulis press, and pictures, statues and busts in plaster of Paris produced at the "Academy" in Glasgow University.

The names of the brothers are often reproduced on title-pages and colophons of their publications in their Latinized form, "Robertus et Andreas Foulis".

The brothers were buried in the Ramshorn Cemetery. Due to a widening of Ingram Street the graves now lie beneath the pavement but are still marked, using their initials in the paving.

References
 Famous Glaswegians: Robert Foulis
 Gazetteer for Scotland: Robert Foulis
 Robert & Andrew Foulis, the Foulis Press, and Their Legacy
 The Glasgow Story: Robert Foulis and Andrew Foulis
 
 The Foulis Press and The Foulis Academy - Glasgow's Eighteenth-Century School of Art and Design, by George Fairfull-Smith, 2001

Notes

External links
 

1707 births
1776 deaths
Scottish printers
Scottish publishers (people)
People associated with the University of Glasgow
People of the Scottish Enlightenment